Zhang Quanjing (December 1931 – 8 November 2022) was a Chinese politician who served as head of the Organization Department of the Chinese Communist Party from 1994 to 1999.

Zhang was a member of the Standing Committee of the 8th and 9th Chinese People's Political Consultative Conference. He was a representative of the 13th, 14th, and 15th National Congress of the Chinese Communist Party.

Early life and education
Zhang was born in Pingyuan County, Shandong, in December 1931.

Political career
Zhang joined the revolution in February 1946 and joined the Chinese Communist Party (CCP) in September 1949. 

Zhang taught at schools before getting involved in politics. He was head of the Organization Department of the CCP Shandong Provincial Committee in June 1985 and subsequently secretary of the Shandong Provincial Commission for Discipline Inspection in December 1988.

In December 1991, Zhang became deputy head of the Organization Department of the Chinese Communist Party, rising to head in October 1994.

On 8 November 2022, Zhang died in Beijing, at the age of 90.

References

1931 births
2022 deaths
People from Pingyuan County, Shandong
People's Republic of China politicians from Shandong
Chinese Communist Party politicians from Shandong
Members of the Standing Committee of the 8th Chinese People's Political Consultative Conference
Members of the Standing Committee of the 9th Chinese People's Political Consultative Conference